Xeniades is a genus of skippers in the family Hesperiidae.

Species
Recognised species in the genus Xeniades include:
 Xeniades chalestra Hewitson, 1866
 Xeniades difficilis Draudt, [1924]
 Xeniades hermoda (Hewitson, 1870)
 Xeniades laureatus (Draudt, 1924)
 Xeniades orchamus (Cramer, 1777)
 Xeniades pteras Godman, 1900
 Xeniades quadrata (Herrich-Schäffer, 1869)
 Xeniades pteras (Hewitson, 1870)
 Xeniades putumayo (Constantino and Salazar, 2013)
 Xeniades rinda (Evans, 1955)
 Xeniades victoria Evans, [1955]

References

Natural History Museum Lepidoptera genus database

Hesperiini
Hesperiidae genera